Kenneth Holm (born 5 February 1958) is a Swedish luger. He competed in the men's doubles event at the 1980 Winter Olympics.

References

External links
 

1958 births
Living people
Swedish male lugers
Olympic lugers of Sweden
Lugers at the 1980 Winter Olympics
Sportspeople from Stockholm